Diopsiulus annandalei, is a species of millipede in the family Stemmiulidae. It is endemic to Sri Lanka.

References

Endemic fauna of Sri Lanka
Millipedes of Asia
Animals described in 1916